Nimble Giant Entertainment, SA (formerly known as NGD Studios) is an Argentine video game developer located in Buenos Aires, Argentina.  They started as a three group fusion and they first created a game for a construction kit toy called Mis Ladrillos, which is similar to Lego toys.

In 2004, Nimble Giant created a mobile gaming division, making games for known brands like Axe and doing development for the multinational GlobalFun. After releasing some successful games, GlobalFun acquired the mobile division from NGD Studios in 2007.

The company is currently continuing development of a real-time, 3D massively multiplayer online role-playing game (MMORPG) which emphasizes flexible gameplay and dynamic content. The game is called Regnum Online, and it has been in development for five years before ended up being released during the first quarter of 2007. The game was intended for the Spanish-speaking market at the beginning but then improved enough to be targeted for other zones as well, more recently the game has struggled to maintain a critical population and has scaled back some of its international servers.

The game currently officially supports English, Spanish, German, French and Dutch but they have stated plans to open the translation tools so volunteers can incorporate other languages.

The game uses a proprietary engine called NG3D which was built from scratch with massive multiplayer games in mind. It supports a variety of features found in today's engines, such as hardware shaders support, continuous world loading, asynchronous resource management and a flexible gameplay system.

Regnum Online was officially released on May 24, 2007. Any information about future expansions and features have been not disclosed yet. With the update of the NG3D engine, Nimble Giant Entertainment made graphic updates on Regnum Online. In 2011, they released a game called Bunch of Heroes, made with the new NG3D 2.0, and in 2013, they changed the game title to Champions of Regnum. In 2012, they helped on developing a game called Maldark: Conqueror of Worlds with Cartoon Network.

In late 2016, NGD acquired Red Katana, a developer founded in 2010, making its founder, Martín Cao, to replace Andrés Chilkowski as chief executive officer.

In May 2019, NGD Studios was rebranded as Nimble Giant Entertainment with the hiring of former Rockstar Games executive Jeronimo Barrera as its vice president of product development, however he left the studio in June 2020.

In November 2020, Embracer Group announced that they acquired the company through Saber Interactive, which will be the parent company.

List of games

References

External links
 
  Regnum Online
  Regnum Online
 Global Fun
  Mis Ladrillos

Companies based in Buenos Aires
Video game development companies
Video game companies of Argentina
Saber Interactive
2020 mergers and acquisitions